Vanadyl acetylacetonate is the chemical compound with the formula VO(acac)2, where acac– is the conjugate base of acetylacetone. It is a blue-green solid that dissolves in polar organic solvents. The coordination complex consists of the vanadyl group, VO2+, bound to two acac– ligands via the two oxygen atoms on each. Like other charge-neutral acetylacetonate complexes, it is not soluble in water.

Synthesis
The complex is generally prepared from vanadium(IV), e.g. vanadyl sulfate:
VOSO4 + 2 Hacac → VO(acac)2 + H2SO4

It can also be prepared by a redox reaction starting with vanadium pentoxide. In this reaction, some acetylacetone is oxidized to 2,3,4-Pentanetrione.

Structure and properties
The complex has a square pyramidal structure with a short V=O bond. This d1 compound is paramagnetic. Its optical spectrum exhibits two transitions. It is a weak Lewis acid, forming adducts with pyridine and methylamine.

Applications
It is used in organic chemistry as a catalyst for the epoxidation of allylic alcohols by tert-butyl hydroperoxide (TBHP). The VO(acac)2–TBHP system exclusively epoxidizes geraniol at the allylic alcohol position, leaving the other alkene of geraniol untouched.  By comparison, m-CPBA, another epoxidizing agent, reacts with both alkenes, creating the products in a two to one ratio favoring reaction at the alkene away from the hydroxyl group.  TBHP oxidizes VO(acac)2 to a vanadium(V) species which coordinates the alcohol of the substrate and the hydroperoxide, directing the epoxidation to occur at the alkene close to this coordination site.

Biomedical aspects
Vanadyl acetylacetonate exhibits insulin mimetic properties, in that it can stimulate the phosphorylation of protein kinase B (PKB/Akt) and glycogen synthase kinase 3 (GSK-3).  It has also been shown inhibit tyrosine phosphatase (PTPase), PTPases such as PTP1B, which dephosphorylates insulin receptor beta subunit, thus increasing its phosphorylation, allowing for a prolonged activation of IRS-1, PKB, and GSK-3, allowing them to exert their anti-diabetic properties.

External links
 Oxidations tutorial

References

Vanadium(IV) compounds
Acetylacetonate complexes
Vanadyl compounds